5070 may refer to:

In general
 5070, a number in the 5000 (number) range
 A.D. 5070, a year of the 6th millennium CE
 5070 BCE,a year in the 6th millennium BC

Other uses
 5070 Arai, an asteroid in the Asteroid Belt, the 5070th asteroid registered
 Tobu 5070 series, an electric multiple unit train series
 Nokia 5070, a cellphone
 5070th Air Defense Wing of the U.S. Air Force

See also